Clare B. Dunkle (born June 11, 1964) is an American children's fantasy author and librarian.

Biography
Dunkle was born Clare Buckalew in Fort Worth, Texas. She earned a B.A. in Russian with a minor in Latin from Trinity University in San Antonio and worked in Trinity University's library after earning her M.L.S. from Indiana University. For seven years, she and her family lived in the Rheinland Pfalz region of Germany not far from the Roman city of Trier. Her daughters (Elena and Valerie) attended a boarding school there and read her first four books as a series of letters from home.

Works
The Hollow Kingdom Trilogy
The Hollow Kingdom (2003)
Close Kin (2004)
In the Coils of the Snake (2005)
The Sky Inside Series
The Sky Inside (2008) - "In a world well-stocked with genius children, the point-of-view focus through an ordinary boy with questionable free will provides a compelling shift from the expected."
The Walls Have Eyes (2009) - "After an overly expository start, this simple tale provides comforting, enjoyable adventure."
Other Works
By These Ten Bones (2005)
The House of Dead Maids (2010)
Elena Vanishing (2015)
Hope and Other Luxuries: A Mother's Life with a Daughter's Anorexia (2015)

Co-author 
Dunkle co-wrote Elena Vanishing (2015) with her daughter, Elena Dunkle. The memoir is a true account of Elena's struggle with anorexia nervosa, a disorder that took over her life from the age of 17 all the way past college and into adulthood.

Awards
The Hollow Kingdom 2004 Mythopoeic Fantasy Award for Children's Literature

References

External links
 
 Miss Erin Interview with Clare

 

1964 births
21st-century American novelists
American children's writers
American fantasy writers
American librarians
American women librarians
American women novelists
Indiana University alumni
Trinity University (Texas) alumni
Women science fiction and fantasy writers
Writers from San Antonio
Living people
21st-century American women writers
Novelists from Texas